Drepanostachyum is an Asian genus of medium-sized mountain clumping bamboos in the grass family. They are native to China, Indochina, and the Indian Subcontinent.

Taxonomy
The differences between this genus and Himalayacalamus are subtle: Drepanostachyum species have many equal branches while those of  Himalayacalamus have one dominant branch.

Species

Formerly included
several species now considered better suited to other genera: Ampelocalamus Dendrocalamus Fargesia Himalayacalamus

References

Bambusoideae genera
Bambusoideae